The IEEE Masaru Ibuka Consumer Electronics Award is a Technical Field Award of the IEEE given for outstanding contributions to consumer electronics technology.  It is named in honor of Masaru Ibuka, co-founder and honorary chairman of Sony Corporation. The award is currently given each year to an individual or a team of up to three people (although in 2002, it was given to five people). The award was established by the IEEE Board of Directors in 1987, and is sponsored by Sony Corporation.

Recipients of this award receive a bronze medal, a certificate and an honorarium.

Recipients 
Source

See also
 Prizes named after people

External links
 Information about the award at IEEE
 List of recipients of the IEEE Masaru Ibuka Award

References 

Awards established in 1987
Masaru Ibuka Consumer Electronics Award